Khuga River is a river of Manipur, India. It is a tributary of the Manipur River.

The Khuga is impounded by the Khuga Dam at Churachandpur to form the Khuga Reservoir.

References 

Rivers of Manipur
Rivers of India